Matías Damián Alonso Vallejo (born 16 April 1985) is a Uruguayan professional footballer who plays as a forward for Uruguay Montevideo.

Club career
Born in Montevideo, Alonso started his career at local Club Atlético River Plate, signing with Peñarol in 2005 and not being successful at either club. He moved to Spain subsequently, first with RC Celta de Vigo's reserves in the country's Segunda División B.

Alonso joined Real Murcia in 2007, being immediately loaned to another team in the third division, SE Ibiza-Eivissa. He appeared rarely for the main squad after returning, spending most of his spell with the B side.

After Murcia's relegation from Segunda División, Alonso joined Granada CF in July 2010. In the following transfer window, without having made any official appearances for the Andalusians, he returned to his country, signing with C.A. Cerro on loan.

On 1 September 2011, Alonso agreed to a one-year loan with Zamora CF in Spain's third tier. In February 2013, after a brief spell in China, he returned to his homeland and joined Juventud de Las Piedras.

Alonso moved abroad again in September 2013, signing with A.S. Bari of the Serie B. Just three months later, however, he left Italy and moved to Defensor Sporting.

Personal life
Alonso's older brother, Iván, was also a footballer and a forward. He too began his career at River Plate.

His cousin, Diego Alonso, also played several years in Spain.

References

External links
TenfieldDigital profile 

1985 births
Living people
Uruguayan people of Spanish descent
Uruguayan footballers
Footballers from Montevideo
Association football forwards
Uruguayan Primera División players
Uruguayan Segunda División players
Club Atlético River Plate (Montevideo) players
Peñarol players
C.A. Cerro players
Juventud de Las Piedras players
Defensor Sporting players
Segunda División players
Segunda División B players
Celta de Vigo B players
Real Murcia players
Real Murcia Imperial players
Granada CF footballers
Zamora CF footballers
China League One players
Serie B players
S.S.C. Bari players
Bolivian Primera División players
The Strongest players
Uruguay under-20 international footballers
Uruguayan expatriate footballers
Expatriate footballers in Spain
Expatriate footballers in China
Expatriate footballers in Italy
Expatriate footballers in Bolivia
Uruguayan expatriate sportspeople in Spain
Uruguayan expatriate sportspeople in China
Uruguayan expatriate sportspeople in Italy
Uruguayan expatriate sportspeople in Bolivia